Henri Donald Foster (July 31, 1889 – December 23, 1969) was an American actor who appeared in a number of television series during the 1950s and 1960s, including Perry Mason, The Addams Family, Bewitched and The Monkees. He played recurring character Herbert Johnson, the Baxters' dotty neighbor in the 1960s sitcom, Hazel. He also had bit parts in a few Hollywood films.

Foster's first acting experience was on a showboat on the Mississippi River. His Broadway debut came in The Country Cousin (1917). His final Broadway performance was in The Ponder Heart (1956).

On December 23, 1969, Foster died at his home in Hollywood, California. He was 80 years old.

Filmography

References

External links

1889 births
1969 deaths
American male film actors
American male television actors
20th-century American male actors